Ambohima is a genus of Malagasy araneomorph spiders in the family Phyxelididae, and was first described by C. E. Griswold in 1990.

Species
 it contains ten species, found only on Madagascar:
Ambohima andrefana Griswold, Wood & Carmichael, 2012 – Madagascar
Ambohima antisinanana Griswold, Wood & Carmichael, 2012 – Madagascar
Ambohima avaratra Griswold, Wood & Carmichael, 2012 – Madagascar
Ambohima maizina Griswold, Wood & Carmichael, 2012 – Madagascar
Ambohima pauliani Griswold, 1990 – Madagascar
Ambohima ranohira Griswold, Wood & Carmichael, 2012 – Madagascar
Ambohima sublima Griswold, 1990 (type) – Madagascar
Ambohima vato Griswold, Wood & Carmichael, 2012 – Madagascar
Ambohima zandry Griswold, Wood & Carmichael, 2012 – Madagascar
Ambohima zoky Griswold, Wood & Carmichael, 2012 – Madagascar

See also
 List of Phyxelididae species

References

Araneomorphae genera
Phyxelididae
Spiders of Madagascar